Alan J. Bovard (September 24, 1906 – July 11, 1983) was an American football player and coach. He was an All-Big Ten Conference center at the University of Michigan in 1929.  He later served as the athletic director at Michigan Technological University from 1947 to 1972 and the head football coach from 1947 to 1956.

Athlete
Bovard was born in Pittsburgh, Pennsylvania, and grew up in Ithaca, New York.  He enrolled at the University of Michigan in 1926 and played at the center position for the Michigan Wolverines football teams from 1926 to 1929.  As a senior in 1929, he was selected as an All-Big Ten Conference player.

High school coach
Bovard graduated from Michigan in 1930 and served as an assistant football coach under Harry Kipke for the 1930 Michigan Wolverines football team.  He was employed as a high school football and basketball coach from 1931 to 1947.  He coached Lansing's J. W. Sexton High School basketball team to Michigan's Class A championship in the 1944-1945 season and also coached the school's football team to the state Class A championship in 1946.

Michigan Tech
In January 1947, Bovard was hired as the athletic director, head football coach and head of the physical education department at Michigan Technological University.  He served as the football coach from 1947 to 1956.  In 1948, Bovard led the Michigan Tech Huskies football team to its first undefeated season, finishing the season with a 7–0 record and outscoring opponents 209 to 58.  He served as athletic director for 25 years and expanded Michigan Tech's athletic program into eleven varsity and seventeen intramural programs.  Bovard also served as the school's head basketball coach for two years, compiling a record of 19 wins and 14 losses.

In October 1972, Bovard announced his retirement from Michigan Tech, effective December 31, 1972.

Death and Hall of Fame inductions
In July 1983, Bovard died in Marquette, Michigan, where he had been hospitalized for several weeks.

Bovard was inducted into the Upper Peninsula Hall of Fame in 1976 and the Michigan Tech Hall of Fame in 1985.

References

1906 births
1983 deaths
American football centers
Michigan Tech Huskies football coaches
Michigan Wolverines football coaches
Michigan Wolverines football players
High school basketball coaches in Michigan
High school football coaches in Michigan
People from Houghton, Michigan